Hassan Ibrahim Saqer (born 19 October 1990) is an Emirati footballer who plays as a midfielder for Al-Wasl.

Honours

Club 
Al Shabab
Winner
 UAE Arabian Gulf Cup: 2010–11
 GCC Champions League: 2011

Runner-up
 UAE President's Cup: 2012–13
 UAE Arabian Gulf Cup: 2011–12

International 
UAE
Third place
 AFC Asian Cup: 2015

External links 
 

1990 births
Living people
Emirati footballers
United Arab Emirates international footballers
2015 AFC Asian Cup players
Al Shabab Al Arabi Club Dubai players
Shabab Al-Ahli Club players
Al-Wasl F.C. players
Association football midfielders
UAE Pro League players